Hard Labor is 2011 Brazilian drama film directed by Juliana Rojas and Marco Dutra. It premiered in the Un Certain Regard section at the 2011 Cannes Film Festival. It was shot in São Paulo, Paulínia, and Campinas, all cities of the state of São Paulo.

Cast
 Helena Albergaria as Helena
 Marat Descartes as Otávio
 Naloana Lima as Paula
 Gilda Nomacce as Gilda
 Marina Flores as Vanessa
 Lilian Blanc as Inês
 Thiago Carreira as Ricardo
 Hugo Villavicenzio as Jorge

Festivals & Awards 

 Official Selection - Un Certain Regard, Cannes Film Festival, 2011.
Havana Star Prize - Best Screenplay, Havana Film Festival New York, 2012.

References

External links
 

2011 drama films
2011 films
Brazilian drama films
Films shot in Campinas
Films shot in Paulínia
Films shot in São Paulo
2010s Portuguese-language films